|}

The Rose Bowl Stakes is a Listed flat horse race in Great Britain open to horses aged two years only.
It is run at Newbury over a distance of 6 furlongs (1,207 metres), and it is scheduled to take place each year in July.

Records

Leading jockey (6 wins):
John Reid  – State Performer (1993), Flowerdrum (1994), Polaris Flight (1995), Crystal Crossing (1996), Victory Note (1997), Golden Silca (1998)

Leading trainer (6 wins):
Peter Chapple-Hyam – Rodrigo de Triano (1991), State Performer (1993), Flowerdrum (1994), Polaris Flight (1995), Crystal Crossing (1996), Victory Note (1997)

Winners since 1988

See also
 Horse racing in Great Britain
 List of British flat horse races

References
Racing Post:

Flat races in Great Britain
Newbury Racecourse
Flat horse races for two-year-olds